Kontraplan is a talk show broadcast live on Croatian Radiotelevision between 2005 and 2007.
Its unique feature was that each guest was located in a separate studio set at a location which defined their background, such as their office or home. One guest as a rule shared the studio with the host to provide an objective, analytical role in the debate.

Kontraplan was a controversial TV show with no limits set to selecting participants or subjects: the guests invited to the show often confronted each other's views on any of the chosen segments of public life, sports, or current affairs, collectively contributing to a different take on a subject. The international embezzlement scandal involving allegations of money laundering through local branches of Hypo Alpe-Adria-Bank International bank was publicly talked about for the first time in Kontraplan.

Production team
Author and host of the show was journalist and TV producer Dubravko Merlić, who later won the Rose d'Or award for The Pyramid series in 2007.

Co-writer - Željko Matić
Journalist - Ana Jergović
Director - Danko Volarić

Sources
Hypo Alpe Adria-A Bank Scandal in Austria
Transcript of conversation Ferdinand Jukić and Dubravko Merlić
Austria's ORF bought report from show Counter Angle
Die Zeit, Bankenskandal

2005 Croatian television series debuts
2007 Croatian television series endings
Croatian television talk shows
Croatian Radiotelevision original programming